Jacob Bada is an Anglican bishop in Nigeria.

In 2019 Bada was translated from Etsako to Akoko.

Notes

Living people
Anglican bishops of Etsako
Anglican bishops of Akoko
21st-century Anglican bishops in Nigeria
Year of birth missing (living people)